Julia Görges and Polona Hercog were the defending champions but Görges decided not to participate.
Hercog played alongside Irina-Camelia Begu, but were eliminated in the first round by María José Martínez Sánchez and Francesca Schiavone.Natalie Grandin and Vladimíra Uhlířová won in the final 7–6(7–5), 6–4 against Vera Dushevina and Galina Voskoboeva

Seeds

Draw

Draw

References
 Main Draw

Korea Open - Doubles
2011 Doubles